Ioana Vrînceanu (born 7 March 1994) is a Romanian rower. She is a world champion, an Olympian and a four time European champion. She was in the Romanian women's eight which the gold at the 2017 World Rowing Championships in Sarasota, Florida.

References

External links

1994 births
Living people
Romanian female rowers
World Rowing Championships medalists for Romania
Rowers at the 2020 Summer Olympics
20th-century Romanian women
21st-century Romanian women